Despero is a supervillain appearing in comic books published by DC Comics. The character first appeared in Justice League of America #1 (October 1960), and was created by Gardner Fox and Mike Sekowsky.

Debuting in the Silver Age of Comic Books, the character is a pink-skinned humanoid extraterrestrial with three eyes and psychic powers. Despero has appeared in both comic books and other DC Comics-related products such as animated television series and feature films, trading cards, and video games. He is an enemy of the Martian Manhunter, Booster Gold, the Green Lantern Corps and the Justice League. Despero appeared in the live-action Arrowverse television series The Flash in the eighth season in the five part event Armageddon, portrayed by Tony Curran.

In 2010, IGN named Despero the 96th-greatest comic book villain of all time.

Publication history
Despero first appeared in Justice League of America #1 (October 1960) and writer Mike Conroy noted: "It was the first of several run-ins the would-be universe conqueror would have with the superteam".

Despero became a semi-regular villain and returned in Justice League of America #26 (March 1964), #133–134 (August–September 1976), and #177–178 (April–May 1980). The character made cameo appearances in Justice League of America #247–250 (February–May 1986) and then featured as the main villain in issues #251–254, dated June–September 1986.

Despero returned in an extensive story arc in Justice League America #37–40 (April–July 1990) and Justice League Europe #30–34 (September 1991–January 1992). The character's body reappeared as the host for L-Ron in Justice League Task Force #0 (October 1994), #13–33 (June 1994–March 1996), and #37 (August 1996) and Justice League International (vol. 2) #67–68 (August–September 1994). Despero reappeared in spirit form in Supergirl (vol. 4) #17–18 (January–February 1998) and Young Justice #6 (March 1999).

Despero eventually reappeared whole in the graphic novel JLA/JSA: Virtue and Vice (December 2002), and featured in the "Crisis of Conscience" storyline in JLA #115–119 (September– November 2005), Superman/Batman #33 (March 2007), and Trinity #4 (June 2008). Despero returned to a more human form in an alternate universe storyline in Booster Gold (vol. 2) #5 (February 2008) and #7–10 (April–August 2008).

The character returned in Justice League of America (vol. 2) #38 (December 2009) and featured in R.E.B.E.L.S. Vol. 2 #12–13 (March–April 2010).

Fictional character biography
Despero first appears when in pursuit of two rebels from the planet Kalanor, which he rules as a tyrant (in Pre-Crisis it is an other-dimensional solar system). They are attempting to create a weapon to defeat him. The rebels make contact with the Justice League of America with JLA member Flash accepting Despero's challenge after he places the rest of the group in a hypnotic trance, but the Flash is defeated in a game similar to chess due to Despero cheating using his third eye's mental powers, and along with the rest of the JLA sent to different worlds. Despero found out about this by reading the mind of one of the rebels he had tracked down and teleported, though her father and Flash were protected by the dimensional traveller's 'blue glow'. The JLA are able to escape all the dangers on the worlds and return to Earth using a dimensional traveler one of Despero's henchmen possesses after the Flash defeats him. Despero has found the rebel and plans to use the energy-absorbing weapon they hoped to use to disable his weapons to conquer Earth, but Snapper Carr uses it to weaken the villain after pretending he has been hypnotized, though the 'blue glow' protected him. Despero is then imprisoned and Kalanor is freed.

The villain has his third eye surgically removed, making him lose his hypnotic powers. Eventually it grows back, he fakes his death in an explosion at a lab and in revenge ages half of the Justice League and banishes the remainder to three other worlds, where he has caused reptile, insect, and marine life to become intelligent, planning to conquer the worlds later. When Despero attempts to deceive Wonder Woman by disguising himself as an aged Superman, she overpowers the villain with her Lasso of Truth, realizing the energy should not have affected Superman, and forces him to undo his actions. Despero is thwarted again when the Justice League intervene in his intergalactic plans of conquest, save member the Martian Manhunter who is being forced to play in a life and death chess match.

Despero eventually returns with even greater abilities, and a new body (now physically enhanced by the "Flame of Py'tar", a remnant of the nuclear energy responsible for creating his race), and completely destroys the Justice League Satellite. After defeating the Justice League, Despero reshapes Gotham City to suit his purposes. Taunted by Batman, Despero is eventually distracted, allowing fellow member Vibe to extinguish the Flame of Py'tar. The villain's form is immediately dispelled and reality restores itself.

Despero eventually reforms, and targets the Justice League member Gypsy. After murdering Gypsy's parents, Despero is about to kill her when the Martian Manhunter intervenes. The villain quickly defeats the Manhunter, although fellow Justice League member Guy Gardner arrives and hurls Despero away. Despero attacks the League at their headquarters, and kills the comatose Steel (on life support for injuries sustained during a battle against the androids of Professor Ivo). When Despero is about to murder the Blue Beetle, the Martian Manhunter bestows upon him the gift of "Mayavanna": a sacred Martian rite that provides the subject with a reality in which they obtain their desires. Despero sees himself killing the entire League and destroying the world, and is immediately at peace. The villain then reverts into a fetus, and is eventually given to trader Manga Khan in exchange for his servant robot, L-Ron.

A re-aged Despero is angered by this defeat and escapes from Manga Khan, returning to Earth to battle the Justice League. Unknown to Despero, Khan hires the bounty hunter Lobo to recapture him. Despero engages the Justice League, Justice League Europe, and Lobo in Times Square, New York City, and keeps them all at bay. A desperate Green Lantern Kilowog and L-Ron use the slave collar Despero still wears to switch his mind with L-Ron's, with the diminutive robot's body being destroyed shortly afterwards. Now in Despero's body, L-Ron returns to Manga Khan.

L-Ron reappeared, still in Despero's body, and had a number of adventures with the Justice League Task Force and Justice League International. Despero returns in spirit form, and temporarily repossesses his old form until stopped by the heroine Supergirl. The villain makes a second attempt to return to a corporeal state, possessing the Martian Manhunter. The team Young Justice, however, use the Manhunter's fear of fire against him to draw J'onn's psyche to the surface, expelling Despero from his body so that team ally the Secret and banish Despero's spirit form.

Despero's spirit eventually returns with the aid of JSA villain Johnny Sorrow, and takes over the body of President of the United States Lex Luthor. Together they release the Seven Deadly Sins which possess several members of the JLA and JSA, and neutralize the wizard Shazam. The remainder of the teams successfully drive the Sins from their comrades, and eventually defeat both Sorrow and Despero, who is driven from Luthor when exposed to Sorrow's lethal stare. The villain returns as the guiding force behind a new Secret Society of Super Villains, and allows them to remember they once learned the Justice League's identities. Although Despero takes mental control of several members of the League, he is eventually stopped by Green Lantern and imprisoned on the planet Oa.

Having allied himself with a race that destroys species unworthy of survival, Despero attempts to convince them to destroy Earth by using an alien substance known as the 'Blackrock' to influence Earth's alien superhumans—Martian Manhunter, Supergirl, Starfire, etc.—to turn against humanity by playing on their occasional feelings of isolation. His efforts are foiled when Batman exposes himself to the Blackrock while under attack by Superman, the sight of his friend's contamination helping Superman to recognise what is happening to him, allowing Superman to confront the aliens directly and convince them that Despero deceived them. Despero returned in his original human form when plucked from the timestream by Mister Mind, and is convinced to join a group called "The Time Stealers". The villains successfully create an alternate universe that differs significantly from the original. Booster Gold and several allies (Rip Hunter and the Justice League International) eventually undo the change and restore the original universe.

Despero briefly allied with villains Morgaine le Fey and Enigma and became god-like until stopped by the combined efforts of Superman, Batman, and Wonder Woman. Despero returns to attack the Justice League, but when teleported away by member Zatanna, is imprisoned on Oa once again.

At the request of human computer Vril Dox, Despero joins in the fight against the original Starro (a humanoid), that controls all other versions and is conquering the galaxy. Despero engages Starro in combat and, although easily destroyed, begins to regenerate into a superior form, which was always the villain's intent. Vril Dox uses Despero's still-living head as a weapon against Starro and its forces.

The New 52
In September 2011, DC Comics cancelled all of its monthly books and rebooted its fictional continuity in an initiative called The New 52. In this new timeline, Despero first appears when he arrives in the Watchtower wearing a Kryptonite ring where he subdues Atom and Firestorm. He attacks the rest of the Justice League until he ends up subdued by Martian Manhunter.

During the "Forever Evil" storyline, Despero appears as a member of the Secret Society of Super Villains at the time when the Crime Syndicate arrived from their Earth. When Stargirl and Martian Manhunter arrive in Denver, they are ambushed by Despero.

Powers and abilities
Despero is an alien from the planet Kalanor, and in addition to a genius intellect possesses a third eye on his forehead capable of mind control, illusions, telekinesis, and telepathy. Despero is also empowered by the "Flame of Py'tar", a mystical source of power that grants him massive superhuman strength, durability, speed, reflexes and the ability to alter his biomass (from human-sized to massive, even reintegrating himself molecule by molecule). His power varies based on the psionic energy he wields; for example, through the complete flame of Py'tar he once had the ability to manipulate reality to a degree, creating monsters and demons out of an earthen city. Otherwise without it, he has still repeatedly been shown to be more powerful than Kryptonians, Amazons, Hourman and even Captain Marvel.

Other versions
 In the comics, Despero is only shown for a brief period of time. In Injustice: Gods Among Us, he crashes into Earth, going through an office building which kills several people. Sinestro chases after him, exclaiming that he will not allow Despero to harm anyone. Despero responds in anger, telling him that "it was that damn corps of yours" that brought him down. Sinestro uses his powers and places Despero's hands on his neck, feigning a struggle. Sinestro snaps Despero's neck using his yellow ring in front of Hal Jordan and John Stewart, saying he had no choice. Despero is not mentioned or seen again in the comics.
 Despero makes an appearance in issue #1 of the comic book tie-in of Justice League Unlimited.

In other media

Television
 Despero appears in the Justice League two-part episode "Hearts and Minds", voiced by Keith David. This version is an alien outcast who discovered the Flame of Py'tar, which granted him the ability to control others' minds and project powerful energy blasts capable of overpowering Green Lanterns, built an army of followers empowered by the Py'tar, defeated several members of the Green Lantern Corps, and threatened to spread his fanatical crusade across the galaxy. Upon discovering the Flame of Py'tar is the dormant life-force of the planet Kalanor, the Martian Manhunter allows it to speak through him and expose Despero as a fraud before releasing the Py'tar and spreading its power across Kalanor, restoring its lush vegetation, transforming Despero's followers into trees, and dragging Despero himself underground.
 Despero appears in the Batman: The Brave and the Bold episode "The Eyes of Despero!", voiced by Kevin Michael Richardson. This version has eyes on his palms in addition to his third eye. He brainwashes the Green Lantern Corps into serving him until Hal Jordan seemingly sacrifices himself and the Corps. Undeterred, Despero tries to corrupt Mogo to use his vast power to brainwash entire planets until Batman, Guy Gardner, Sinestro, and G'nort join forces to free Mogo and defeat Despero.
 Despero appears in the Young Justice: Invasion episode "Cornered". This version is a gladiator who allows his majordomo L-Ron speak for him. He arrives on Earth to prove himself as the greatest warrior in 93 Star Systems, traps the Hall of Justice in a force-field, puts Zatanna into a trance to stop her interfering, and fights Captain Marvel and Superboy. After defeating them, Bumblebee, and Mal Duncan / Guardian distract him while Miss Martian frees Zatanna, who uses Despero's powers against him, allowing Superboy to defeat him. Afterward, Despero is imprisoned in the Warworld's stasis cells.
 Despero appears in The Flash five-part episode "Armageddon", voiced by Tony Curran, who also portrays his human form. This version wears a special belt that enables him to time-travel and assume a human form. Additionally, he is from a possible future where the Earth was destroyed by an Armageddon caused by a speedster. Believing the Flash was responsible, Despero travels back in time to challenge him until the Atom tampers with his belt. In response, Despero gives the Flash a week to prove him wrong. Following a trip to the future, the Flash reveals Eobard Thawne was the true culprit. Despero tries to kill Thawne, but battles the Flash once more until he is defeated, depowered, and forced to flee.

Film
Despero makes a minor non-speaking appearance in Superman/Batman: Public Enemies.

Video games
Despero appears in Justice League Task Force.

References

External links
 Despero Chronology. DCU Guide. Archived March 11, 2016.

Villains in animated television series
Characters created by Gardner Fox
Characters created by Mike Sekowsky
Comics characters introduced in 1960
DC Comics aliens
DC Comics characters who use magic
DC Comics characters who are shapeshifters
DC Comics characters with accelerated healing
DC Comics characters with superhuman strength
DC Comics demons
DC Comics extraterrestrial supervillains
DC Comics supervillains
DC Comics telepaths
DC Comics characters who have mental powers
DC Comics telekinetics 
Fictional characters who can manipulate reality
Fictional characters with energy-manipulation abilities
Fictional characters with elemental transmutation abilities
Fictional cult leaders
Fictional dictators
Fictional illusionists
Fictional mass murderers
Fiction about mind control